St Canice's Cathedral, also known as Kilkenny Cathedral, is a cathedral of the Church of Ireland in Kilkenny city, Ireland. It is in the ecclesiastical province of Dublin. Previously the cathedral of the Diocese of Ossory, it is now one of six cathedrals in the United Dioceses of Cashel and Ossory.

History

The present building dates from the 13th century and is the second longest cathedral in Ireland, after St Patrick's Cathedral, Dublin. Beside the cathedral stands a 100 ft 9th-century round tower. St Canice's tower is an example of a well-preserved 9th-century "Celtic Christian" round tower. It is dedicated to St Canice.  It is one of only three such medieval round towers in Ireland that can still be climbed to the top, the other two being Kildare Round Tower in Kildare Town and Devenish Round Tower in County Fermanagh.

The cathedral stands on the site of a Celtic Christian monastery said to have been founded in the sixth century by St Canice as a daughter house of Aghaboe Abbey. The Synod of Rathbreasail in 1111, which first divided Ireland into territorial dioceses, included both Aghaboe and Kilkenny in the Diocese of Ossory, with the episcopal see at Kilkenny, the capital of the Kingdom of Ossory. Thus the abbey church became the cathedral. The erroneous belief that the see was originally at Aghaboe and later transferred to Kilkenny is traced by John Bradley to a 16th-century misinterpretation of a 13th-century property transfer.

Following the English Reformation, the reformed church in Ireland was established by decree of the Irish Parliament to become the state church in the Kingdom of Ireland as the Church of Ireland, taking possession of most church property (and so retaining a great repository of religious architecture and other items, though some were later destroyed).

The substantial majority of the population, however, remained faithful to Roman Catholicism, despite the political and economic advantages of membership in the state church. Since St Canice's Cathedral was taken over in this way, Roman Catholic adherents were consequently obliged to worship elsewhere. St Mary's Cathedral in Kilkenny was later built for the Roman Catholic diocese.

The cathedral contains some 16th-century monuments. The architectural style of the cathedral is Early Gothic and is built of limestone. It is richly endowed with many stained glass windows, including the east window which is a replica of the original 13th-century window. The cathedral contains some of the finest 16th-century monuments in Ireland.

Ancient history

Kilkenny was the ancient capital of the Kingdom of Ossory and St Canice's Cathedral stands on a site which has experienced Christian worship since the 6th century. The name of "Kilkenny" itself retains the anglicised version of the Irish Cill Chainnigh, which translates as "Church of Cainneach", or "Canice".

The earliest church on the site is presumed to have been made of wood, later to be replaced in the later medieval period by a romanesque-style stone church. This was in turn replaced by the current imposing medieval cathedral. A few yards from the present south transept stands an imposing 9th-century round tower, 100 ft high.

Accessible only by a steep set of internal ladders, it may once have been both a watchtower and a refuge. The summit gives a clear view of Kilkenny and the countryside around. The hill on which the cathedral stands is believed to be the centre of the first major settlement at Kilkenny, and the round tower suggests an early ecclesiastical foundation.

Much less is known about the early secular structures, but the area around the cathedral, called Irishtown, is the oldest part of the present city.

There is no mention of Kilkenny in the lives of Cainnech of Aghaboe, Ciarán of Saighir or any of the early annals of Ireland suggesting that in those times it was not of great importance. The Annals of the Four Masters recorded entries for Cill Chainnigh in 1085 ("Ceall-Cainnigh was for the most part burned") and again in 1114 ("... Cill-Cainnigh ... were all burned this year").

The present building was begun in the 13th century, when it was at the western end of Kilkenny, and shows some similarities to St Patrick's Cathedral, Dublin, both dating from the same period and completed by the end of the 13th century.

In the Red Book of Ossory, fifteen pages dating from about 1324 contain sixty Latin verses, or Cantilenae, written by Richard de Ledrede, Bishop of Ossory, best known for his connection with trials for heresy and witchcraft. As stated elsewhere in the Red Book, Ledred wrote these verses "for the Vicars Choral of Kilkenny Cathedral, his priests and clerics, to be sung on great festivals and other occasions, that their throats and mouths, sanctified to God, might not be polluted with theatrical, indecent, and secular songs."

The cathedral was "restored" between 1844 and 1867 without the removal of any important medieval features.

Description

Cruciform, the cathedral was built in the Early English, or English Gothic, style of architecture, of limestone, with a low central tower supported on black marble columns. The exterior walls, apart from the gables, are embattled, and there are two small spires at the west end. The cathedral is seventy-five yards long, and its width along the transepts is forty-one yards.

Inside, high pointed arches form entrances from the nave into the choir and the two transepts.  Between the nave and each aisle is a row of five black marble clustered columns, with high moulded arches. The nave is lighted by a large west window and five clerestory windows, while the aisles each have four windows. The choir has a groined ceiling with fine tracery and a central group of cherubs.

The baptismal font is medieval and the ancient stone of enthronement for bishops still exists under the seat of the medieval throne in the north transept, where to this day the bishops of Ossory are enthroned.

The cathedral contains some of the finest ancient monuments in Ireland, including one to Bishop David, and the tombs of many bishops of Ossory and several owners of Kilkenny Castle. The subjects of the memorials stretch widely across the social spectrum, from the great figures of the House of Ormonde to the humble shoemaker and carpenter. In the north transept is the ancient Chair of St Kieran, made of carved stone, still used as the chair of enthronement for the Church of Ireland Bishops of Cashel and Ossory.

There are continental carvings on the choir stalls and the hammerbeam roof. The cathedral has many stained glass windows, including the fine east window, which is a replica of the 13th-century original.

On the eastern side of the south transept is the consistory court, built by Bishop Pococke, with the chapter house to the north of it. From the north transept a dark passage leads into St Mary's chapel, where the services of St Canice's parish once took place, and a later parish church next to it holds the tomb of Bishop Gafney (died 1576). Despite some 19th-century restoration, the cathedral has been carefully preserved in its original style and form. Near the cathedral's east end is Bishop's Palace.

St. Canice's Library
Was established in 1693 by Bishop Thomas Otway, it contains many theological documents and artifacts particularly relating to Bishop Otway and Bishop Edward Maurice from the 17th and 18th centuries. In 2013 the Maurice Otway collection was loaned to Maynooth College for restoration and safe keeping; earlier some documents have been moved to Church of Ireland Representative Body house in Dublin.

Burials and memorials
 William de Karlell (died 1383), Chief Baron of the Irish Exchequer, and his brother John (died 1393), Chancellor of St Patrick's Cathedral, Dublin
The 2nd Earl of Ormond (1331–1382)
The 8th Earl of Ormond (c.1467–1539) 
The 10th Earl of Ormond (1531–1614)
The 11th Earl of Ormond (1559–1632/3)
David Rothe (1573–1650), Roman Catholic Bishop of Ossory – a cenotaph to his memory, though his remains were interred in St. Mary's Church
Griffith Williams (1589?–1672), Bishop of Ossory
Hugh Hamilton (1729–1805), Bishop of Ossory
Denis Pack (1772–1823), Major-General in the British Army

See also

List of abbeys and priories in County Kilkenny.
Bishop of Cashel and Ossory
Dean of Kilkenny

References

Further reading

Prim's History and Antiquities of Kilkenny Cathedral (1857)
 

Rae, E. C., 'An O'Tunney masterpiece reconstituted' [16th-century cenotaph in St Canice's cathedral] in Old Kilkenny Review: Journal of the Kilkenny Archaeological Society, 18 (1966), 62–71
Woodworth, David, 'St Canice's library' in Old Kilkenny Review: Journal of the Kilkenny Archaeological Society, 22 (1970), 5–10; 23 (1971), 15–22
McCarthy, Michael, 'Eighteenth century cathedral restoration' [Correspondence relating to St Canice's Cathedral, Kilkenny] in Studies; an Irish quarterly review, 65 (1976), 330–343; 66 (1977), 60–76
Crotty, G. 'The Foulkes monument in St Canice's cathedral' in Old Kilkenny Review: Journal of the Kilkenny Archaeological Society, ns, 2 (1982), 347–351
Phelan, Margaret M 'Butler tombs and furnishings in St Canice's Cathedral, Kilkenny' in Journal of the Butler Society, 2 (1982), 164–166
Lightbown, Ronald, 'Impressions of nineteenth-century Kilkenny (1800–50)' in Old Kilkenny Review: Journal of the Kilkenny Archaeological Society, 48 (1996), 57–80
Phelan, Margaret M, 'An unidentified tomb in St Canice's Cathedral, Kilkenny', in Old Kilkenny Review: Journal of the Kilkenny Archaeological Society, 48 (1996), 40–44
Lynas, Norman, 'The restoration of St Canice's Cathedral 1844–1867 under Dean Vignoles', in Kirwan, John (ed.), op. cit., 183–191
Ireland, Aideen M., 'Kilkenny Cathedral treasure trove', in Kirwan, John (ed.), Kilkenny: studies in honour of Margaret M. Phelan (Kilkenny: Kilkenny Archaeological Society, 1997), 159–167
Phelan, Margaret M, 'A tomb frontal in St Canice's Cathedral, Kilkenny', in Old Kilkenny Review: Journal of the Kilkenny Archaeological Society, 50 (1998), 20–23
Gillespie, Raymond, 'St Canice's Cathedral in an age of change 1500–1560', in Bradley, John; Healy, Diarmuid; & Murphy, Anne (eds.), Themes in Kilkenny's history: a selection of lectures from the NUI Maynooth – Radio Kilkenny academic lecture series 1999 (Kilkenny: Red Lion, 2000), 47–56
Heckett, Elizabeth Wincott, 'The Margaret Fitzgerald Tomb Effigy: A late medieval headdress and gown in St Canice's Cathedral, Kilkenny', in Koslin, Désirée G.; Snyder, Janet (eds.), Encountering medieval textiles and dress: objects, texts, images (the new Middle Ages) (New York: Palgrave, 2002), 209–22
Law, Edward J., 'The tomb of John, 2nd Marquess of Ormonde, St Canice's Cathedral' in Old Kilkenny Review: Journal of the Kilkenny Archaeological Society, 55 (2003), 141–148
Integrated Conservation Group, 'The Bishop's Palace, Kilkenny' in Old Kilkenny Review: Journal of the Kilkenny Archaeological Society, 55 (2003), 30–53
Law, Edward J., 'The bells and bell-ringers of St Canice's Cathedral' in Old Kilkenny Review: Journal of the Kilkenny Archaeological Society, 55 (2003), 6–10
Ó Drisceoil, Cóilín, 'Probing the past: a geophysical survey at St Canice's Cathedral, Kilkenny', in Old Kilkenny Review: Journal of the Kilkenny Archaeological Society, 56 (2004), 80–106
Bradley, John, 'Death, art and burial: St Canice's cathedral, Kilkenny in the sixteenth century', in Hourihane, Colum, (ed.), Irish art historical studies in honour of Peter Harbison (Index of Christian Art, Occasional Papers, 7) (Dublin: Four Courts in association with Princeton University, 2004), 210–218

External links

St. Canice's Cathedral and Round Tower
Photograph of the cathedral at sacred-destinations.com
Photograph of the round tower at charnecki.com

13th-century churches in Ireland
Churches in Kilkenny (city)
Anglican cathedrals in the Republic of Ireland
Diocese of Cashel and Ossory
Tourist attractions in County Kilkenny
Deans of Ossory
Bell towers in Ireland
Pre-Reformation Roman Catholic cathedrals